Kimera may refer to:

People
 Kimera (singer), Korean opera singer
 Kimera of Buganda, king of the Kingdom of Buganda
 Kimera Bartee (1972–2021), American baseball player and coach

Others
 Kimera (manga), manga series written and illustrated by Kodaka Kazumo
 Kimera, species in the science fiction television series, Earth: Final Conflict
 Kimera Evo 37, sports car

See also
 Chimera (disambiguation)